Lee Byeong-in (born 10 June 1968) is a South Korean rower. She competed in the women's coxless pair event at the 1988 Summer Olympics.

References

External links
 

1968 births
Living people
South Korean female rowers
Olympic rowers of South Korea
Rowers at the 1988 Summer Olympics
Place of birth missing (living people)
Asian Games medalists in rowing
Rowers at the 1986 Asian Games
Asian Games silver medalists for South Korea
Medalists at the 1986 Asian Games